Let's Talk About Love is the second studio album by German duo Modern Talking, released on 14 October 1985 by Hansa Records. The album peaked at number two in Germany, spending four weeks at that position. After spending 11 weeks within the top 10 and 44 weeks altogether on the German chart, it eventually earned a platinum certification from the Bundesverband Musikindustrie (BVMI) for shipments in excess of 500,000 copies in Germany.

The album's only single, "Cheri, Cheri Lady", spent four weeks at the top of the German Singles Chart, while also topping the charts in Austria, Norway and Switzerland.

Track listing

Personnel
 Dieter Bohlen – production, arrangements
 Gerd Tratz – artists photos
 Andreas Grassl – artists photos
 Manfred Vormstein – art direction, photo design

Charts

Weekly charts

Year-end charts

Certifications

Release history
 1985 Germany: LP Hansa 207 080-630
 1985 Germany: MC Hansa 407 080-630
 1985 Germany: CD Hansa 610 522-222

References

1985 albums
Hansa Records albums
Modern Talking albums